The Mutthorn (3,035 m) is a mountain of the Bernese Alps, overlooking the Kander Glacier in the Bernese Oberland. It lies between the valleys of Kandersteg (west) and Lauterbrunnen (east).

The Mutthornhütte is located south of summit at 2,900 metres. It is owned by the Swiss Alpine Club.

References

External links
 Mutthorn on Hikr

Mountains of the Alps
Alpine three-thousanders
Mountains of Switzerland
Mountains of the canton of Bern
Bernese Alps